Stanley Arnoux (born September 9, 1986) is a former American football linebacker. He was drafted by the New Orleans Saints in the fourth round of the 2009 NFL Draft. He played college football at Wake Forest.

Biography
Arnoux's parents were born in Haiti, and he is fluent in Haitian Creole.

Professional career

Pre-draft
At the 2009 NFL Scouting Combine, Arnoux ran the second fastest 40-yard dash time at the linebacker position. His official 40-yard dash time was 4.61 seconds.

New Orleans Saints
Arnoux was drafted by the New Orleans Saints in the fourth round of the 2009 NFL Draft. In the first practice of Saints rookie minicamp, Arnoux tore his left Achilles tendon.  He missed the entire 2009 season due to the severity of the injury. He was signed to a four-year contract on September 7, 2009 and immediately placed on injured reserve due to his injury.  In 2010, he was on the active roster for the Saints' first 10 games,  but suffered another Achilles tendon injury in a game against Seattle, and was placed on the injured reserve list on November 23, 2010.

He was released by the Saints on July 29, 2011.

References

External links
New Orleans Saints bio
Wake Forest Demon Deacons bio

1986 births
Living people
American football linebackers
American sportspeople of Haitian descent
New Orleans Saints players
People from Sunrise, Florida
Players of American football from Florida
Wake Forest Demon Deacons football players
Sportspeople from Broward County, Florida